In geometry, the small ditrigonal icosidodecahedron (or small ditrigonary icosidodecahedron) is a nonconvex uniform polyhedron, indexed as U30. It has 32 faces (20 triangles and 12 pentagrams), 60 edges, and 20 vertices.

It is constructed from Schwarz triangle (3 3 ) with Wythoff symbol 3 |  3. Its hexagonal vertex figure alternates equilateral triangle and pentagram faces.

Related polyhedra
Its convex hull is a regular dodecahedron. It additionally shares its edge arrangement with the great ditrigonal icosidodecahedron (having the triangular faces in common), the ditrigonal dodecadodecahedron (having the pentagrammic faces in common), and the regular compound of five cubes. As a simple polyhedron, it is also a hexakis truncated icosahedron where the triangles touching the pentagons are made coplanar, making the others concave.

See also
 List of uniform polyhedra

References

External links
 

Uniform polyhedra